The fifth season of the American comedy television series Scrubs premiered on NBC on January 3, 2006 and concluded on May 16, 2006 and consists of 24 episodes. For the first twelve episodes, two new episodes were broadcast back-to-back every Tuesday at 9:00 p.m. ET. Then NBC returned to broadcasting one new episode every week (at 9:00 p.m. ET), followed by a rerun. For the first three weeks of this, the rerun episode was a cast favorite episode, with available audio commentary tracks on NBC's website to accompany the episodes. Guest stars in the fifth included Jason Bateman and Mandy Moore, as well the introduction of new recurring characters played by Elizabeth Banks and Travis Schuldt. This season was nominated for the Primetime Emmy Award for Outstanding Comedy Series.

Season 5 begins with J.D. living in a hotel. He has become an attending physician now on the same level as Dr. Cox. In the season premiere, Elliot has taken a new fellowship in another hospital, only to be fired in the next episode. Elliot then returns to Sacred Heart and becomes an attending. Turk and Carla are trying to have a baby, despite Turk still having doubts. Finally, some new interns have arrived to Sacred Heart, chief among them being Keith Dudemeister. Season 5 also focuses on the relationship between J.D. and Dr. Cox, who now find themselves equals.

Cast and characters

Main cast
Zach Braff as Dr. John "J.D." Dorian
Sarah Chalke as Dr. Elliot Reid
Donald Faison as Dr. Chris Turk
Neil Flynn as The Janitor
Ken Jenkins as Dr. Bob Kelso
John C. McGinley as Dr. Perry Cox
Judy Reyes as Nurse Carla Espinosa

Recurring roles
Travis Schuldt as Keith Dudemeister
Robert Maschio as Dr. Todd Quinlan
Christa Miller as Jordan Sullivan
Sam Lloyd as Ted Buckland
Aloma Wright as Nurse Laverne Roberts
Johnny Kastl as Dr. Doug Murphy
Michael Learned as Patricia Wilk

Guest stars

Elizabeth Banks as Dr. Kim Briggs
Jay Kenneth Johnson as Dr. Matthews
Mandy Moore as Julie Quinn
Paul Adelstein as Dr. Stone
Jason Bateman as Mr. Sutton
Tom Cavanagh as Dan Dorian
Alexander Chaplin as Sam Thompson
Dave Foley as Dr. Lester Hedrick
Cheryl Hines as Paige Cox
Josh Randall as Jake
Nicole Sullivan as Jill Tracy
The Blanks as the Worthless Peons

Production
Both Gabrielle Allan and Matt Tarses, two writers since the first season, left at the end of season 4. Eric Weinberg left in the middle of season 5 to work on a pilot. Tim Hobert and Tad Quill were promoted to executive producers in mid season. The staff writer of season 4 did not return for season 5. Kevin Biegel and Aseem Batra were hired as staff writers for this season.

Writing staff
Bill Lawrence – executive producer/head writer
Tim Hobert – co-executive producer (episodes 1–12)  / executive producer/assistant head writer (episodes 13–24)
Tad Quill – co-executive producer (episodes 1–12) / executive producer/assistant head writer (episodes 13–24)
Neil Goldman and Garrett Donovan – co-executive producers
Bill Callahan – co-executive producer
Eric Weinberg – co-executive producer (episodes 1–12)
Mike Schwartz – supervising producer
Debra Fordham – producer
Mark Stegemann – producer
Janae Bakken – producer
Angela Nissel – consulting producer
Kevin Biegel – staff writer
Aseem Batra – staff writer

Production staff
Bill Lawrence – executive producer/showrunner
Randall Winston – producer
Liz Newman – co-producer (episodes 1–12) / producer (episodes 13–24)
Danny Rose – associate producer (episodes 1–12) / co-producer (episodes 13–24)

Directors
Includes directors who directed 2 or more episodes, or directors who are part of the cast and crew
Bill Lawrence (4 episodes)
Michael Spiller (2 episodes)
Linda Mendoza (2 episodes)
John Inwood (2 episodes)
Victor Nelli, Jr. (2 episodes)
Zach Braff (1 episode)
Randall Winston (producer) (1 episode)
Rick Blue (editor) (1 episode)
John Michel (editor) (1 episode)
Richard Alexander Wells (assistant director) (1 episode)

Episodes

References

General references

External links

 

 
2006 American television seasons
5